The 1991–92 Eintracht Frankfurt season was the 92nd season in the club's football history. In 1991–92 the club played in the Bundesliga, the top tier of German football. It was the club's 29th season in the Bundesliga.

The season ended up with Eintracht claiming the 3rd position in the reunited Germany's Bundesliga, losing the championship on the last match day when already relegated Rostock won the match.

Friendlies

Indoor soccer tournament

Competitions

Bundesliga

League table

Results by round

Matches

DFB-Pokal

UEFA Cup

Squad

Squad and statistics

|}

Notes

References

Sources

External links
 Official English Eintracht website 
 German archive site
 1991–92 Bundesliga season at Fussballdaten.de 

1991-92
German football clubs 1991–92 season